Count Frederik of Ahlefeldt-Rixingen (1623 in Søgård – 7 July 1686, in Copenhagen) was a Danish landowner and statesman. By birth member of the House of Ahlefeldt, he was the first reigning Count of Rixingen. He was also Grand Chancellor during the reign of King Christian V.

Early life 
Ahlefeldt was born on Søgård Manor, east of Kliplev in the Southern Jutland as the eldest child and only son of Frederik of Ahlefeldt-Seestermühe (1594-1657) and his wife and relative, Birgitte of Ahlefeldt-Graasten (1600-1632). He had one younger sister, Elisabeth von Rumohr (1625-1653).

Biography 
At age twenty, he was sent on an educational tour of Europe, where over a six-year period he studied at universities in Jena, Bologna, Paris and Amsterdam.

In 1657, he was appointed to the Land Council as a commissioner. He also served in a diplomatic capacity to the state of Brandenburg on behalf of the Duke of Gottorp. In 1660, he was sent to England in a similar capacity, and there ended a trade and friendship treaty on behalf of Denmark which was signed February 1661. After his return, he was appointed as stadtholder for Copenhagen, then as a civil judge, and finally as a steward to the governor of Dithmarschen.

Ahlefeldt owned Gråsten Manor, as well as estates at Søgård, Ballegård, and Herningsholm in Herning. He spent most of his time at Gråsten. On October 11, 1663, he received the Order of the Elephant. 

In 1672, he became governor of the county of Langeland. During 1670s and up to the fall of Christoffer Gabel (1617–1673), Ahlefeldt was the leading minister of the government. In 1673, he was replaced by Peder Schumacher Griffenfeld (1635-1699). Following the arrest of Griffenfeld, Ahlefeldt was made chancellor again. He held that post until 1686.

Imperial County of Rixingen 
He was raised ad personam in 1665 to Heiliger Römischer Reichsgraf, Count of the Holy Roman Empire in immediate vassalage to the Holy Roman Emperor. But in 1669 he bought the County of Rixingen (later passed to the Dukes of Richelieu in 1751), thus becoming the real sovereign count. After his death, his son from his second marriage, Count Carl von Ahlefeldt, inherited the dominions of Rixingen and Mörsberg in 1686, which he later passed on to his brother-in-law, Count Friedrich Ludwig von Nassau-Ottweiler.

Marriages 
On 28 December 1656, Ahlefeldt married Countess Margarethe Dorothea zu Rantzau (18 March 1642, Breitenburg26 August 1665, Itzehoe). The only daughter of Count Christian zu Rantzau (1614–1663), governor of the Duchy of Holstein and one of Denmark's richest men. Ahlefeldt and Margarethe Dorothea had two children:
 Countess Christiane von Ahlefeldt-Rixingen (1659-1695); married Frederick Louis, Count of Nassau-Ottweiler and had issue
 Count Friedrich von Ahlefedt-Rixingen (1662–1708); married firstly Christiane Charlotte Gyldenløve (1672-1689), an illegitimate daughter of King Christian V of Denmark and Sophie Amalie Moth, Countess of Samsøe; married secondly Countess Armgard Margareta von Reventlow (1679-1709). He didn't have issue from either marriage.

On 1 December 1668 he married Marie Elisabeth of Leiningen-Hartenburg-Dagsburg (10 March 1648, Hartenburg13 April 1724, Augustenburg), daughter of Friedrich Emich, Count von Leiningen-Dagsburg-Hartenburg and his wife, Countess Sibylla von Waldeck (1619-1678). Ahlefeldt and Marie Elisabeth had three children:
 Count Carl von Ahlefeldt-Rixingen: married Countess Ulrike Antoinette of Danneskiold-Laurvig (1686-1755) and had issue
 Countess Charlotte Sibylla von Ahlefeldt-Rixingen (1672-1726); married Count Georg Ludwig zu Solms-Rödelheim (1664-1715) and had issue
 Countess Sophie Amalie von Ahlefeldt-Rixingen (1675-1741); married Prince Frederick William of Schleswig-Holstein-Sonderburg-Augustenburg and had issue.

References 

1623 births
1686 deaths
17th-century Danish people
House of Ahlefeldt